The 1914 Pittsburgh Pirates season was the 33rd season of the Pittsburgh Pirates franchise; the 28th in the National League. The Pirates finished seventh in the league standings with a record of 69–85. It was the Pirates first losing season since 1898.

Regular season

Season standings

Record vs. opponents

Game log

|- bgcolor="ffbbbb"
| 1 || April 14 || @ Cardinals || 1–2 || Griner || Adams (0–1) || — || — || 0–1
|- bgcolor="ccffcc"
| 2 || April 15 || @ Cardinals || 5–1 || Cooper (1–0) || Sallee || — || — || 1–1
|- bgcolor="ccffcc"
| 3 || April 16 || @ Cardinals || 4–1 || McQuillan (1–0) || Hageman || — || — || 2–1
|- bgcolor="ccffcc"
| 4 || April 17 || @ Cardinals || 2–0 || Kantlehner (1–0) || Perritt || — || — || 3–1
|- bgcolor="ccffcc"
| 5 || April 18 || @ Reds || 8–5 || Conzelman (1–0) || Rowan || — || 7,500 || 4–1
|- bgcolor="ccffcc"
| 6 || April 19 || @ Reds || 9–3 || Cooper (2–0) || Benton || McQuillan (1) || 10,000 || 5–1
|- bgcolor="ccffcc"
| 7 || April 21 || @ Reds || 5–2 || McQuillan (2–0) || Yingling || — || — || 6–1
|- bgcolor="ccffcc"
| 8 || April 23 || Cardinals || 5–1 || Adams (1–1) || Hageman || — || 20,000 || 7–1
|- bgcolor="ffbbbb"
| 9 || April 24 || Cardinals || 1–8 || Perritt || Harmon (0–1) || — || — || 7–2
|- bgcolor="ccffcc"
| 10 || April 26 || @ Cubs || 6–4 || Conzelman (2–0) || Lavender || McQuillan (2) || 12,000 || 8–2
|- bgcolor="ccffcc"
| 11 || April 28 || @ Cubs || 5–2 || McQuillan (3–0) || Humphries || — || — || 9–2
|- bgcolor="ccffcc"
| 12 || April 29 || @ Cubs || 7–0 || Adams (2–1) || Lavender || — || 1,000 || 10–2
|-

|- bgcolor="ccffcc"
| 13 || May 1 || Reds || 4–2 || Conzelman (3–0) || Benton || McQuillan (3) || 4,000 || 11–2
|- bgcolor="ccffcc"
| 14 || May 2 || Reds || 7–5 || Cooper (3–0) || Douglas || Adams (1) || — || 12–2
|- bgcolor="ccffcc"
| 15 || May 3 || @ Reds || 3–1 (11) || McQuillan (4–0) || Ames || — || 15,000 || 13–2
|- bgcolor="ccffcc"
| 16 || May 6 || Cubs || 1–0 || Adams (3–1) || Cheney || — || — || 14–2
|- bgcolor="ccffcc"
| 17 || May 7 || Cubs || 7–1 || Cooper (4–0) || Humphries || — || — || 15–2
|- bgcolor="ffbbbb"
| 18 || May 9 || Cubs || 2–10 || Lavender || Conzelman (3–1) || — || 9,000 || 15–3
|- bgcolor="ffbbbb"
| 19 || May 10 || @ Cubs || 1–4 || Cheney || McQuillan (4–1) || — || 9,000 || 15–4
|- bgcolor="ffffff"
| 20 || May 12 || Braves || 1–1 (10) ||  ||  || — || — || 15–4
|- bgcolor="ffbbbb"
| 21 || May 14 || Giants || 3–4 || Demaree || Adams (3–2) || — || 10,000 || 15–5
|- bgcolor="ffbbbb"
| 22 || May 15 || Giants || 3–5 || Mathewson || McQuillan (4–2) || — || — || 15–6
|- bgcolor="ffbbbb"
| 23 || May 16 || Giants || 0–2 || Tesreau || Cooper (4–1) || — || — || 15–7
|- bgcolor="ffbbbb"
| 24 || May 18 || Braves || 1–4 || James || Adams (3–3) || — || — || 15–8
|- bgcolor="ccffcc"
| 25 || May 19 || Braves || 7–5 || Harmon (1–1) || Cocreham || — || 2,000 || 16–8
|- bgcolor="ccffcc"
| 26 || May 20 || Braves || 4–1 || Cooper (5–1) || Luque || — || — || 17–8
|- bgcolor="ccffcc"
| 27 || May 21 || Phillies || 6–2 || Harmon (2–1) || Mayer || — || 3,000 || 18–8
|- bgcolor="ccffcc"
| 28 || May 22 || Phillies || 8–2 || Adams (4–3) || Marshall || — || — || 19–8
|- bgcolor="ccffcc"
| 29 || May 23 || Phillies || 7–2 || McQuillan (5–2) || Oeschger || — || — || 20–8
|- bgcolor="ccffcc"
| 30 || May 25 || Robins || 5–4 || Cooper (6–1) || Wagner || — || — || 21–8
|- bgcolor="ffbbbb"
| 31 || May 26 || Robins || 2–3 || Reulbach || Adams (4–4) || — || — || 21–9
|- bgcolor="ffbbbb"
| 32 || May 28 || Phillies || 0–2 || Mayer || Harmon (2–2) || — || — || 21–10
|- bgcolor="ffbbbb"
| 33 || May 29 || Reds || 2–3 || Douglas || McQuillan (5–3) || — || — || 21–11
|- bgcolor="ffbbbb"
| 34 || May 30 || Reds || 2–3 || Yingling || Cooper (6–2) || Ames || — || 21–12
|- bgcolor="ffbbbb"
| 35 || May 30 || Reds || 0–3 || Davenport || Adams (4–5) || — || — || 21–13
|- bgcolor="ffbbbb"
| 36 || May 31 || @ Reds || 1–2 || Ames || Harmon (2–3) || — || — || 21–14
|- bgcolor="ffffff"
| 37 || May 31 || @ Reds || 5–5 ||  ||  || — || 26,000 || 21–14
|-

|- bgcolor="ffbbbb"
| 38 || June 1 || @ Cubs || 3–7 || Cheney || O'Toole (0–1) || — || 2,500 || 21–15
|- bgcolor="ffbbbb"
| 39 || June 2 || @ Cubs || 3–7 || Pierce || Adams (4–6) || — || — || 21–16
|- bgcolor="ffbbbb"
| 40 || June 3 || Cubs || 5–6 || Humphries || Harmon (2–4) || Cheney || — || 21–17
|- bgcolor="ffbbbb"
| 41 || June 5 || @ Phillies || 3–13 || Mayer || McQuillan (5–4) || — || — || 21–18
|- bgcolor="ccffcc"
| 42 || June 6 || @ Phillies || 5–2 || Adams (5–6) || Marshall || — || — || 22–18
|- bgcolor="ccffcc"
| 43 || June 8 || @ Phillies || 7–5 || Harmon (3–4) || Alexander || McQuillan (4) || — || 23–18
|- bgcolor="ffbbbb"
| 44 || June 9 || @ Phillies || 1–3 || Mayer || Conzelman (3–2) || — || — || 23–19
|- bgcolor="ffbbbb"
| 45 || June 10 || @ Braves || 2–11 || Rudolph || Cooper (6–3) || — || — || 23–20
|- bgcolor="ffbbbb"
| 46 || June 11 || @ Braves || 2–3 || James || Adams (5–7) || — || — || 23–21
|- bgcolor="ffbbbb"
| 47 || June 12 || @ Braves || 3–5 || Perdue || McQuillan (5–5) || — || — || 23–22
|- bgcolor="ffbbbb"
| 48 || June 13 || @ Braves || 3–4 || Tyler || Cooper (6–4) || — || — || 23–23
|- bgcolor="ccffcc"
| 49 || June 15 || @ Giants || 3–2 || Adams (6–7) || Marquard || — || — || 24–23
|- bgcolor="ffbbbb"
| 50 || June 16 || @ Giants || 0–3 || Tesreau || Harmon (3–5) || — || — || 24–24
|- bgcolor="ffbbbb"
| 51 || June 17 || @ Giants || 0–5 || Mathewson || McQuillan (5–6) || — || — || 24–25
|- bgcolor="ccffcc"
| 52 || June 18 || @ Giants || 4–3 || Harmon (4–5) || Demaree || — || 18,000 || 25–25
|- bgcolor="ccffcc"
| 53 || June 20 || @ Robins || 4–3 || Cooper (7–4) || Reulbach || — || — || 26–25
|- bgcolor="ffbbbb"
| 54 || June 22 || @ Robins || 1–5 || Pfeffer || Harmon (4–6) || — || — || 26–26
|- bgcolor="ffbbbb"
| 55 || June 23 || @ Robins || 1–2 || Rucker || Cooper (7–5) || — || — || 26–27
|- bgcolor="ffbbbb"
| 56 || June 24 || Cardinals || 0–3 || Doak || Adams (6–8) || — || — || 26–28
|- bgcolor="ccffcc"
| 57 || June 25 || Cardinals || 4–1 || Conzelman (4–2) || Perritt || — || — || 27–28
|- bgcolor="ccffcc"
| 58 || June 26 || Cardinals || 3–2 (10) || McQuillan (6–6) || Sallee || — || — || 28–28
|- bgcolor="ccffcc"
| 59 || June 27 || Cardinals || 4–2 (7) || Harmon (5–6) || Griner || — || — || 29–28
|- bgcolor="ffbbbb"
| 60 || June 28 || @ Reds || 6–7 || Rowan || McQuillan (6–7) || — || — || 29–29
|- bgcolor="ffbbbb"
| 61 || June 28 || @ Reds || 0–1 || Schneider || O'Toole (0–2) || — || — || 29–30
|- bgcolor="ccffcc"
| 62 || June 29 || @ Cardinals || 4–1 || Cooper (8–5) || Perritt || — || — || 30–30
|- bgcolor="ffbbbb"
| 63 || June 30 || @ Cardinals || 0–1 || Sallee || Harmon (5–7) || — || — || 30–31
|-

|- bgcolor="ffbbbb"
| 64 || July 1 || @ Cardinals || 1–5 || Hageman || Conzelman (4–3) || — || — || 30–32
|- bgcolor="ccffcc"
| 65 || July 3 || Cubs || 2–1 || O'Toole (1–2) || Lavender || — || — || 31–32
|- bgcolor="ffbbbb"
| 66 || July 4 || Cubs || 0–1 || Vaughn || Adams (6–9) || — || — || 31–33
|- bgcolor="ffbbbb"
| 67 || July 4 || Cubs || 2–4 || Cheney || Cooper (8–6) || — || — || 31–34
|- bgcolor="ffbbbb"
| 68 || July 5 || @ Cubs || 4–5 (10) || Smith || O'Toole (1–3) || — || — || 31–35
|- bgcolor="ccffcc"
| 69 || July 7 || Giants || 5–2 || Adams (7–9) || Marquard || — || — || 32–35
|- bgcolor="ffbbbb"
| 70 || July 8 || Phillies || 7–10 || Marshall || O'Toole (1–4) || Oeschger || — || 32–36
|- bgcolor="ffbbbb"
| 71 || July 9 || Phillies || 0–1 || Tincup || McQuillan (6–8) || — || — || 32–37
|- bgcolor="ffbbbb"
| 72 || July 10 || Phillies || 2–5 || Matteson || Harmon (5–8) || — || — || 32–38
|- bgcolor="ccffcc"
| 73 || July 11 || Phillies || 3–1 || Mamaux (1–0) || Rixey || — || — || 33–38
|- bgcolor="ccffcc"
| 74 || July 15 || Robins || 4–3 || Cooper (9–6) || Allen || — || — || 34–38
|- bgcolor="ffbbbb"
| 75 || July 16 || Robins || 3–4 || Rucker || Mamaux (1–1) || Ragan || — || 34–39
|- bgcolor="ffbbbb"
| 76 || July 16 || Robins || 2–5 || Pfeffer || Kantlehner (1–1) || — || — || 34–40
|- bgcolor="ffbbbb"
| 77 || July 17 || Giants || 1–3 (21) || Marquard || Adams (7–10) || — || — || 34–41
|- bgcolor="ccffcc"
| 78 || July 18 || Giants || 3–0 || Harmon (6–8) || Demaree || — || — || 35–41
|- bgcolor="ffbbbb"
| 79 || July 18 || Giants || 5–6 (10) || Mathewson || McQuillan (6–9) || — || 20,000 || 35–42
|- bgcolor="ffbbbb"
| 80 || July 20 || Braves || 0–1 || Tyler || Cooper (9–7) || James || — || 35–43
|- bgcolor="ffbbbb"
| 81 || July 21 || Braves || 0–6 || Rudolph || O'Toole (1–5) || — || — || 35–44
|- bgcolor="ffbbbb"
| 82 || July 22 || Braves || 0–1 (11) || James || Harmon (6–9) || — || — || 35–45
|- bgcolor="ccffcc"
| 83 || July 22 || Braves || 8–4 || Mamaux (2–1) || Crutcher || — || — || 36–45
|- bgcolor="ffbbbb"
| 84 || July 23 || Braves || 0–2 || Tyler || Cooper (9–8) || — || — || 36–46
|- bgcolor="ccffcc"
| 85 || July 24 || Phillies || 3–2 || McQuillan (7–9) || Mayer || — || — || 37–46
|- bgcolor="ffbbbb"
| 86 || July 25 || @ Giants || 2–4 || Mathewson || Adams (7–11) || — || 20,000 || 37–47
|- bgcolor="ccffcc"
| 87 || July 27 || @ Giants || 3–1 || Harmon (7–9) || Marquard || — || 5,000 || 38–47
|- bgcolor="ffbbbb"
| 88 || July 29 || @ Giants || 0–1 || Tesreau || McQuillan (7–10) || — || — || 38–48
|- bgcolor="ccffcc"
| 89 || July 30 || @ Robins || 7–2 || Cooper (10–8) || Allen || — || — || 39–48
|- bgcolor="ffbbbb"
| 90 || July 31 || @ Robins || 3–9 || Ragan || Harmon (7–10) || — || — || 39–49
|-

|- bgcolor="ffbbbb"
| 91 || August 1 || @ Robins || 1–7 || Pfeffer || Adams (7–12) || — || — || 39–50
|- bgcolor="ffbbbb"
| 92 || August 1 || @ Robins || 1–10 || Reulbach || O'Toole (1–6) || — || 10,000 || 39–51
|- bgcolor="ccffcc"
| 93 || August 3 || @ Robins || 7–3 (13) || Cooper (11–8) || Ragan || — || 1,000 || 40–51
|- bgcolor="ffbbbb"
| 94 || August 4 || @ Braves || 0–1 || Rudolph || Harmon (7–11) || — || — || 40–52
|- bgcolor="ffbbbb"
| 95 || August 5 || @ Braves || 0–4 || James || O'Toole (1–7) || — || — || 40–53
|- bgcolor="ffbbbb"
| 96 || August 6 || @ Braves || 4–5 (10) || Strand || Adams (7–13) || — || 9,000 || 40–54
|- bgcolor="ccffcc"
| 97 || August 7 || @ Braves || 5–1 || Cooper (12–8) || Cottrell || — || 8,000 || 41–54
|- bgcolor="ccffcc"
| 98 || August 8 || @ Phillies || 4–3 || McQuillan (8–10) || Mayer || Conzelman (1) || — || 42–54
|- bgcolor="ccffcc"
| 99 || August 10 || @ Phillies || 4–2 || Harmon (8–11) || Tincup || — || — || 43–54
|- bgcolor="ffbbbb"
| 100 || August 11 || @ Phillies || 4–5 || Alexander || Conzelman (4–4) || — || 1,000 || 43–55
|- bgcolor="ccffcc"
| 101 || August 13 || Cardinals || 2–1 || Cooper (13–8) || Griner || — || — || 44–55
|- bgcolor="ccffcc"
| 102 || August 13 || Cardinals || 5–2 || Adams (8–13) || Perritt || — || — || 45–55
|- bgcolor="ccffcc"
| 103 || August 14 || Reds || 8–7 || McQuillan (9–10) || Douglas || Harmon (1) || — || 46–55
|- bgcolor="ccffcc"
| 104 || August 15 || Reds || 2–0 || Conzelman (5–4) || Ames || — || — || 47–55
|- bgcolor="ffbbbb"
| 105 || August 17 || Giants || 3–7 || Tesreau || Harmon (8–12) || Fromme || 5,000 || 47–56
|- bgcolor="ccffcc"
| 106 || August 18 || Giants || 3–1 || Adams (9–13) || Marquard || — || 3,000 || 48–56
|- bgcolor="ccffcc"
| 107 || August 19 || Giants || 5–1 || Cooper (14–8) || Demaree || McQuillan (5) || — || 49–56
|- bgcolor="ffbbbb"
| 108 || August 20 || Braves || 3–6 || Rudolph || O'Toole (1–8) || — || — || 49–57
|- bgcolor="ccffcc"
| 109 || August 22 || Braves || 3–2 (12) || Harmon (9–12) || James || — || — || 50–57
|- bgcolor="ffbbbb"
| 110 || August 22 || Braves || 2–4 || Hess || Adams (9–14) || — || — || 50–58
|- bgcolor="ffbbbb"
| 111 || August 24 || Phillies || 2–3 || Marshall || McQuillan (9–11) || Mayer || — || 50–59
|- bgcolor="ccffcc"
| 112 || August 25 || Phillies || 2–0 || Mamaux (3–1) || Alexander || — || — || 51–59
|- bgcolor="ffbbbb"
| 113 || August 26 || Robins || 1–2 || Pfeffer || Cooper (14–9) || — || — || 51–60
|- bgcolor="ffbbbb"
| 114 || August 26 || Robins || 2–4 || Ragan || Adams (9–15) || — || — || 51–61
|- bgcolor="ffbbbb"
| 115 || August 27 || Robins || 0–1 (10) || Reulbach || Harmon (9–13) || — || — || 51–62
|- bgcolor="ccffcc"
| 116 || August 29 || Robins || 1–0 (13) || Mamaux (4–1) || Pfeffer || — || — || 52–62
|- bgcolor="ffbbbb"
| 117 || August 29 || Robins || 4–5 || Ragan || Cooper (14–10) || — || 1,500 || 52–63
|- bgcolor="ffffff"
| 118 || August 31 || Giants || 1–1 (11) ||  ||  || — || — || 52–63
|-

|- bgcolor="ccffcc"
| 119 || September 2 || @ Cardinals || 4–1 || McQuillan (10–11) || Perritt || — || — || 53–63
|- bgcolor="ffffff"
| 120 || September 2 || @ Cardinals || 1–1 (11) ||  ||  || — || — || 53–63
|- bgcolor="ccffcc"
| 121 || September 3 || @ Cardinals || 11–6 || Cooper (15–10) || Perdue || Harmon (2) || — || 54–63
|- bgcolor="ccffcc"
| 122 || September 3 || @ Cardinals || 10–3 (8) || Kantlehner (2–1) || Griner || — || — || 55–63
|- bgcolor="ccffcc"
| 123 || September 4 || @ Cardinals || 2–1 || Harmon (10–13) || Sallee || — || — || 56–63
|- bgcolor="ffbbbb"
| 124 || September 5 || @ Cubs || 2–3 || Zabel || McQuillan (10–12) || — || — || 56–64
|- bgcolor="ffbbbb"
| 125 || September 6 || @ Cubs || 3–8 || Vaughn || Adams (9–16) || — || 8,000 || 56–65
|- bgcolor="ffbbbb"
| 126 || September 7 || Cardinals || 4–7 || Doak || Mamaux (4–2) || — || — || 56–66
|- bgcolor="ccffcc"
| 127 || September 7 || Cardinals || 2–1 || Harmon (11–13) || Sallee || — || — || 57–66
|- bgcolor="ccffcc"
| 128 || September 9 || Cubs || 5–1 || McQuillan (11–12) || Cheney || — || — || 58–66
|- bgcolor="ccffcc"
| 129 || September 10 || Cubs || 4–2 || Cooper (16–10) || Vaughn || — || — || 59–66
|- bgcolor="ccffcc"
| 130 || September 12 || Cubs || 5–4 || Adams (10–16) || Lavender || — || — || 60–66
|- bgcolor="ccffcc"
| 131 || September 12 || Cubs || 4–0 || Kantlehner (3–1) || Humphries || — || — || 61–66
|- bgcolor="ffbbbb"
| 132 || September 13 || @ Cubs || 0–2 || Cheney || Harmon (11–14) || — || 4,000 || 61–67
|- bgcolor="ffbbbb"
| 133 || September 14 || @ Cubs || 4–7 || Vaughn || McQuillan (11–13) || — || — || 61–68
|- bgcolor="ccffcc"
| 134 || September 15 || Reds || 9–0 || Adams (11–16) || Benton || — || — || 62–68
|- bgcolor="ffbbbb"
| 135 || September 16 || @ Phillies || 2–6 || Rixey || Cooper (16–11) || — || 1,000 || 62–69
|- bgcolor="ffbbbb"
| 136 || September 17 || @ Phillies || 3–6 || Matteson || Harmon (11–15) || — || — || 62–70
|- bgcolor="ffbbbb"
| 137 || September 17 || @ Phillies || 0–2 || Tincup || McQuillan (11–14) || — || — || 62–71
|- bgcolor="ffbbbb"
| 138 || September 18 || @ Phillies || 4–6 || Oeschger || Kantlehner (3–2) || — || — || 62–72
|- bgcolor="ffbbbb"
| 139 || September 19 || @ Braves || 3–9 || Davis || Cooper (16–12) || Tyler || — || 62–73
|- bgcolor="ffbbbb"
| 140 || September 21 || @ Braves || 5–6 || Rudolph || Harmon (11–16) || — || — || 62–74
|- bgcolor="ffbbbb"
| 141 || September 22 || @ Braves || 2–8 || Tyler || McQuillan (11–15) || — || — || 62–75
|- bgcolor="ffbbbb"
| 142 || September 23 || @ Robins || 1–5 || Pfeffer || Cooper (16–13) || — || — || 62–76
|- bgcolor="ffbbbb"
| 143 || September 23 || @ Robins || 2–5 || Rucker || Conzelman (5–5) || — || — || 62–77
|- bgcolor="ffbbbb"
| 144 || September 24 || @ Robins || 2–3 || Aitchison || McQuillan (11–16) || — || — || 62–78
|- bgcolor="ffbbbb"
| 145 || September 25 || @ Robins || 2–3 || Schmutz || Kelly (0–1) || — || — || 62–79
|- bgcolor="ffbbbb"
| 146 || September 26 || @ Giants || 2–4 || Tesreau || Harmon (11–17) || — || — || 62–80
|- bgcolor="ccffcc"
| 147 || September 26 || @ Giants || 4–2 || Adams (12–16) || Mathewson || — || 10,000 || 63–80
|- bgcolor="ffbbbb"
| 148 || September 28 || @ Giants || 2–5 || Fromme || McQuillan (11–17) || — || — || 63–81
|- bgcolor="ffbbbb"
| 149 || September 28 || @ Giants || 6–13 (6) || Marquard || Cooper (16–14) || — || — || 63–82
|- bgcolor="ccffcc"
| 150 || September 29 || @ Giants || 5–2 || Harmon (12–17) || Wiltse || — || 500 || 64–82
|- bgcolor="ffbbbb"
| 151 || September 30 || Cardinals || 0–1 || Doak || Cooper (16–15) || — || — || 64–83
|-

|- bgcolor="ccffcc"
| 152 || October 1 || Reds || 5–1 || Adams (13–16) || Ames || — || — || 65–83
|- bgcolor="ccffcc"
| 153 || October 2 || Reds || 2–1 || McQuillan (12–17) || Douglas || — || — || 66–83
|- bgcolor="ccffcc"
| 154 || October 3 || Reds || 1–0 || Harmon (13–17) || Lear || — || 2,000 || 67–83
|- bgcolor="ffbbbb"
| 155 || October 4 || @ Reds || 4–5 || Douglas || Conzelman (5–6) || — || — || 67–84
|- bgcolor="ccffcc"
| 156 || October 4 || @ Reds || 11–4 (6) || Mamaux (5–2) || Benton || — || — || 68–84
|- bgcolor="ccffcc"
| 157 || October 5 || @ Reds || 4–3 || McQuillan (13–17) || Ames || — || — || 69–84
|- bgcolor="ffbbbb"
| 158 || October 5 || @ Reds || 1–4 (7) || Schneider || Kelly (0–2) || — || 300 || 69–85
|-

|-
| Legend:       = Win       = Loss       = TieBold = Pirates team member

Opening Day lineup

Roster

Player stats

Batting

Starters by position 
Note: Pos = Position; G = Games played; AB = At bats; H = Hits; Avg. = Batting average; HR = Home runs; RBI = Runs batted in

Other batters 
Note: G = Games played; AB = At bats; H = Hits; Avg. = Batting average; HR = Home runs; RBI = Runs batted in

Pitching

Starting pitchers 
Note: G = Games pitched; IP = Innings pitched; W = Wins; L = Losses; ERA = Earned run average; SO = Strikeouts

Other pitchers 
Note: G = Games pitched; IP = Innings pitched; W = Wins; L = Losses; ERA = Earned run average; SO = Strikeouts

Relief pitchers 
Note: G = Games pitched; W = Wins; L = Losses; SV = Saves; ERA = Earned run average; SO = Strikeouts

References

External links
 1914 Pittsburgh Pirates team page at Baseball Reference
 1914 Pittsburgh Pirates Page at Baseball Almanac

Pittsburgh Pirates seasons
Pittsburgh Pirates season
Pitts